Sainte-Rose-de-Watford is a municipality in the Municipalité régionale de comté des Etchemins in Quebec, Canada. It is part of the Chaudière-Appalaches region and the population is 747 as of 2009. It is named after Rose of Lima, the first Catholic saint of the Americas and Watford, a town in Hertfordshire, England.

References

Commission de toponymie du Québec
Ministère des Affaires municipales, des Régions et de l'Occupation du territoire

Municipalities in Quebec
Incorporated places in Chaudière-Appalaches